The A87 is a major road in the Highland region of Scotland.

It runs west from its junction with the A82 road at Invergarry, along the north shores of Loch Garry and Loch Cluanie, then down through Glen Shiel and along Loch Duich to Kyle of Lochalsh before crossing the Skye Bridge to Kyleakin, Broadford, and Portree, before terminating at Uig in the north of the Isle of Skye.

Settlement and junctions of the A87
Northwest – Southeast
Uig – junction with the A855 road
Earlish
Romesdal
Eyre
Kensaleyre
Borve – junction with the A850 road
Portree – second junction with the A855 road
Glenvarragill
Sligachan – junction with the A863 road
Sconser
Luib
Dunan
Broadford
Harrapool
junction with the A851 road
Skulamas
Upper Breakish
Skye Bridge
Kyle of Lochalsh
Balmacara
Kirkton
Auchtertyre– junction with the A890 road
Nostie
Ardelve
Dornie
Inverinate
Ault a' chruinn
Invershiel
Shiel Bridge
Loch Cluanie
junction with the A887 road
Loch Garry
Invergarry – junction with the A82

Historic route

The route of the A87 has changed significantly over the years. Until the 1960s, the road ran along Glen Garry as far as Tomdoun, before heading north over the hills to Glen Loyne, where it crossed Loch Loyne with two bridges. It then headed north west to the Cluanie Inn, where it joined the A887. Loch Loyne was dammed as part of a hydro-electric scheme, which put part of this road underwater. A new road was built further to the east, around Loch Loyne, joining with the A887 at Bun Loyne. The remains of the bridges on Loch Loyne are visible when the level of water in the loch is low.

The A87 route used to involve a short ferry crossing over Loch Long at Dornie, but this has since been replaced with a bridge. Nearby, the A87 used to run through the village of Morvich, around an inlet at the end Loch Duich. This has now been bypassed with a causeway and bridge.

In 1995 the Skye Bridge replaced the ferry between Kyle of Localsh on the mainland and Kyleakin on the Isle of Skye. Tolls were met with considerable opposition, until removed in December 2004.

References

Roads in Scotland
Scenic routes in the United Kingdom
Transport in Highland (council area)